Zeeshan Khan (born 20 October 1976) is a Pakistani first-class cricketer who played for Multan.

References

External links
 

1976 births
Living people
Pakistani cricketers
Multan cricketers
Cricketers from Multan